The Prophet of Yonwood is an apocalyptic science fiction novel by Jeanne DuPrau that was published in 2006. It is the third "Book of Ember" of the series, and a prequel to The City of Ember. It is set about fifty years before the Disaster and the establishment of Ember, and approximately three hundred years before the events of The City of Ember, The People of Sparks and The Diamond of Darkhold. It is the prequel to The City of Ember .

Characters 
Nickie is the main character. Grover is her friend in the book. Also, there is the Prophet, Althea Tower, Amanda; her caretaker Mrs. Brenda Beeson, and Nickie’s Aunt Crystal.

Plot
The story starts off with a young girl named Nickie who is traveling with her Aunt Crystal to an old house in Yonwood, North Carolina. Nickie's great-grandfather has died, and the house where he lived, in a neighborhood called Greenhaven, is inherited by Crystal, who plans to sell it. Over time, Nickie begins to love the house and finds a girl named Amanda who lives there. She is there because she used to look after Arthur Green, the great grandfather of Nickie. Plus, Amanda has a dog named Otis that she gives to Nickie. In Yonwood, there is a Prophet named Althea Tower who sees the future of the world in burning flames and smoke, and subsequently spends months in a dream-like semi conscious state, in which she mutters phrases and words. A woman in the town calls them instructions from God and requires townspeople to comply with her interpretation of the words, and insists that the entire city quit their "wrong" ways and start to be good people, so God would be with them. She becomes the power that directs the police in the town to enforce the 'war against evil' and slaps buzzing bracelets on offenders who don't comply. The so called instructions gradually become more and more strict and unreasonable, beginning with things like no sinners, no singing, no lights, and eventually no dogs. During the time, verbal conflict between the U.S. and the Phalanx Nations is going on. The U.S. fears that the Phalanx Nations are trying to send terrorist spies to the U.S. and they take immediate action, although the U.S. never really goes to war with them until 50 years later. Nickie meets a boy named Grover who is obsessed with snakes, but has to give them away because Ms. Beeson says that they are sinful. There is also an old, grumpy man named Hoyt McCoy, who is mean. However, he ends up being a kind man; he studies the stars and made contact with aliens. Hoyt McCoy went to Washington and stopped the war. In the end of the book, Nickie writes a journal that she hides behind a rock for someone to read later in the future. In The City of Ember, Lina Mayfleet and Doon Harrow find the journal when they are escaping/leaving Ember, and in The Diamond of Darkhold, a satellite sent out by Hoyt and other scientists is sent off into space, which later returns to Earth from an Alien planet.

Themes 
Community Crisis. As with all books in the Ember series, there is an underlying crisis within the wider community, nation, or, in the case of The Prophet of Yonwood, world. The tension between the US and the "Phalanx Nations" is a major contributing factor to the behavior and motivations of the characters, especially Mrs. Beeson and Hoyt McCoy.

Loss of Civil Rights. The coming crisis (i.e. war) serves as justification to implement Mrs. Beeson's "war against evil." The book explores how rights can be voluntarily given up in the name of a safer community, even to the point of creating a rigid, dictatorial society where individual rights are subordinated.

Outsiders. In addition to Nickie, Hoyt McCoy is seen as an outsider. His position differs from Nickie's in that he regularly voices his opposition to the "war against evil." Both Nickie and Hoyt are, however, able to see the error in the way Yonwood is governed and it is through their actions (i.e. the actions of an external party) that the community is reformed. McCoy's actions are credited with providing the impetus to avert the coming war.

Absent Parents. Again, in common with the rest of the Ember series, the protagonist is deprived of at least one parent. Nickie is in the temporary care of her aunt, Crystal, and as with DuPrau's other lead characters, she develops a surrogate parental relationship in order to obtain support and guidance.

References 

2006 American novels
The City of Ember
Young adult fantasy novels
American young adult novels
2006 science fiction novels
Prequel novels
Novels set in North Carolina
Religion in science fiction